Silent Night, Bloody Night is a 1972 American slasher film directed by Theodore Gershuny and co-produced by Lloyd Kaufman. The film stars Patrick O'Neal and cult actress Mary Woronov in leading roles, with John Carradine in a supporting performance. The plot follows a series of murders that occur in a small New England town on Christmas Eve after a man inherits a family estate which was once an insane asylum.

Many of the cast and crew members were former Warhol superstars: Mary Woronov, Ondine, Candy Darling, Kristen Steen, Tally Brown, Lewis Love, filmmaker Jack Smith and artist Susan Rothenberg. It was filmed in Oyster Bay, Long Island, New York in 1970 but was not released theatrically until 1972 under the alternate titles Night of the Dark Full Moon, and in 1981 as Death House (sometimes stylized as Deathouse).

Although it is attributed to Zora Investments Associates in the credits, the film was never registered with the United States Copyright Office, and thus fell into the public domain.

Plot 

On Christmas Eve 1950, Wilfred Butler dies in a burning accident outside his mansion in East Willard, Massachusetts. The residence is bequeathed to his grandson, Jeffrey. Twenty years later, in 1970, lawyer John Carter arrives in East Willard on Christmas Eve with his assistant and mistress Ingrid, having been charged by Jeffrey to sell the house. Carter meets with the town's leading citizens: Mayor Adams; Sheriff Bill Mason; the mute Charlie Towman, who owns the local newspaper; and Tess Howard, who operates the town's telephone switchboard. They all agree to buy the Butler mansion on behalf of the town for the bargain price of $50,000, which Jeffrey requires to be paid in cash the next day. Carter and Ingrid spend the night at the Butler mansion, but are brutally murdered in bed with an axe by an unseen assailant. After the murders, the killer places a crucifix in Ingrid's hand and proceeds to phone the sheriff, introducing himself as the house's owner and asking him to investigate Carter's disappearance. While talking with Tess, who forwards his call, the killer calls himself "Marianne".

At nightfall, Jeffrey arrives at the mansion to meet with Carter, but finds it locked and empty. He drives to the mayor's home, where he meets Diane, the mayor's daughter. The mayor has gone to the county's bank to obtain the required cash for the payment, so she redirects Jeffrey to the sheriff's office. Simultaneously, the sheriff heads to the mansion, but first stops at Wilfred Butler's disturbed gravesite, where he is beaten to death with a shovel. Failing to locate the sheriff, Jeffrey returns to the mayor's home, where Diane tells him she has received phone calls for her father from someone named "Marianne" who beckons her to the mansion.

Puzzled by the strange events, Jeffrey and Diane decide to drive to the mansion, but stop after they find the sheriff's abandoned car. The two stop by the newspaper office, where they meet Charlie, who informs them Tess has also gone to the mansion. Jeffrey and Charlie go after her while Diane researches the Butler house's history in the archives. Diane manages to piece together the Butlers' story: In 1930, Wilfred's wife died of tuberculosis. In 1933, his 15-year-old daughter Marianne was raped and got pregnant; the son she gives birth to is Jeffrey, who was sent away to California. In 1935, Wilfred converted the mansion into a mental hospital and had Marianne committed. The rest of the story has apparently been redacted.

Tess arrives at the mansion and finds the sheriff's car running outside. In the foyer, she is greeted by the unseen killer, who bludgeons her to death with a candlestick. Jeffrey meanwhile arrives at Tess's house and finds it empty, after which he returns to Diane at the newspaper office. Diane tells Jeffrey that, based on her research, his mother did not die during his birth like he had thought. Jeffrey and Diane depart together to the mansion. En route, they pass Charlie's car, which has been set on fire; moments later, Charlie throws himself at Jeffrey's car and Jeffrey runs him over, killing him. Examining the body, Jeffrey realizes someone has cut Charlie's hands off.

At the mansion, Jeffrey finds his grandfather's diary in the foyer, which reveals he was the one who got Marianne pregnant. The diary recounts how Wilfred grew hostile toward the complacent hospital staff, so on Christmas Eve 1935, he freed the hospital's patients, causing a massacre that resulted in Marianne's death as well. He then ended up faking his death in 1950 and has been living anonymously in a nearby mental hospital ever since before escaping. Jeffrey tells Diane that his grandfather/father is still alive, and that the sheriff, Tess, Towman and the mayor were all former inmates Wilfred sought revenge on for the death of Marianne. The mayor arrives at the mansion armed with a rifle, and he and Jeffrey open fire, killing each other. The killer, revealed to be the elderly Wilfred Butler, finally appears, and Diane grabs Jeffrey's gun and shoots him dead.

A year later, Diane takes one last look at the Butler mansion before it is destroyed by a bulldozer crew.

Cast

Production

Principal photography for Silent Night, Bloody Night began on November 30, 1970 in Oyster Bay, New York. The James W. Beekman house in Oyster Bay served as the Butler home in the film.  The film originally had the working title Zora, which was the title of an unrelated screenplay owned by Cannon Films. Post-production took place in the summer of 1972, with director Gershuny and editor Tom Kennedy completing dubbing, scoring, and sound effects.

Star Mary Woronov recalled of the production: "Silent Night, Bloody Night was terrible. We were given a weird script, and Ted [Gershuny] tried to spark it up. He tried to make it an artistic statement, but it didn't work. It didn't even make much sense. Most people couldn't understand what was going on–which is not good, particularly for a horror film."

Release
The film was given a limited release in the United States  under the title Night of the Full Dark Moon through Cannon Films, beginning November 17, 1972. It was subsequently released as Silent Night, Bloody Night in the spring of 1973, and continued to screen under this title through December 1973. It subsequently screened in Australia in December 1974. The same year Stiges Film Festival in Spain screened the film as official selection.

The film was released once again in 1981 by Cannon under the title Death House, stylized as Deathouse in some advertisements and on the film's title card.

In 1974, television broadcasting rights to the film were sold to CBS for $300,000, who subsequently screened it as a midnight movie. The film was also shown on Elvira's Movie Macabre, part of WWOR-TV's Fright Night beginning in 1978, and became a staple of late-night television in the November and December months. Despite the film's dark subject matter and depictions of violence, the network chose to air it at Christmastime each year. Executive Larry Casey commented on it, saying, "Don't get me wrong. I loved White Christmas and traditional holiday movies. But how many times can you watch those things? We always pushed the envelope on Fright Night, and Silent Night, Bloody Night was a great fit. WOR never got any complaints for showing it that I heard about."

Critical response 
Upon its initial release, Michael Pitts of the Anderson Daily Bulletin criticized the film for having an unclear plotline and being "poorly photographed." He concluded by writing that the film "is so bad it could have been made for television, but on the other hand most of today's TV films are better than this." The Sydney Morning Herald noted: "The exact plot of the family mania is hard to follow but by the time the whole revolting theme of madness and butchery has been run through the thud of axe against flesh has obliterated any artistic purpose."

AllMovie called it a "minor gem", complimenting the film's "eerie atmosphere" and noting its place as a predecessor to the slasher film genre. Leonard Maltin gave the film two stars, calling it an "uneven low-budgeter." The film was featured in the book 150 Movies You Should Die Before You See, where it was written that the film "manages to disappoint on every level."

Film historian Brian Albright referred to the film as "moody... surreal, and sometimes confusing." In his book Slasher Films: An International Filmography, 1960 Through 2001, Kent Byron Armstrong wrote that the film "has a lethargic pace, but it provides enough intrigue and mystery to help a viewer retain interest." In Nightmare USA: The Untold Story of the Exploitation Independents (2007), Stephen Thrower wrote: "[the film is] “painfully slow... plotted for maximum irritation, with a deferred mystery structure that will have you screaming with impatience after the first hour."

In a review published by The Hysteria Lives!, the film was awarded five out of five stars, with the reviewer noting: "The rather soap-operish proceedings are very involved, but suffice it to say, there's more than enough bodies to please the slasher purists while entertaining those of us who enjoy a classic macabre tale as well." John Kenneth Muir noted that the film "bears all [the] reassuring tell-tale signs of a bad movie, signs that today's garbage might avoid through expense: amateur editing and filming, bad sound, bad film stock, atrocious dialogue, and the rest. Still, at least you know where you stand with a movie like Silent Night, Bloody Night. It doesn't take long to realize that you're trapped in bad movie hell."

Home media
Although there is a 1972 copyright statement in the opening credits for Zora Investment Associates, the film was not registered for copyright, and since its release has fallen into public domain. The film had its VHS release by Paragon Video in the 1980s.

The film is available on DVD from various entertainment companies that specialize in public domain films, though many of the prints on these editions are of extremely poor quality. The majority of the prints used on DVDs were sourced from the VHS transfer released by Paragon Video. 
 
A high-definition restored print of the film (sourced from the original master of the Death House print) was released on DVD by Film Chest on December 10, 2013. The same print was also used for a DVD release by boutique company Code Red in 2013, in a limited edition double feature paired with Invasion of the Blood Farmers (1972).

Influence
Some elements of the film have been noted as influential, particularly the killer's phone calls to victims, which was a significant plot element in Bob Clark's Black Christmas, released two years later.

Related works

Remake and sequel 
A remake by UK production company North Bank Entertainment, Silent Night, Bloody Night: The Homecoming, was released on DVD in the United States by Elite Entertainment in February 2014.

New Wave Independent Pictures produced the sequel to the original film, titled Silent Night, Bloody Night 2: Revival. The film was released on March 15, 2015.

Play adaptation
On December 10, 2016, the film was adapted into a play in Brooklyn, New York for a one-night-only production by One And Done Productions.

See also
 Holiday horror

Notes

References

Sources

External links 

 
 
 
 

1970s slasher films
American independent films
American slasher films
Articles containing video clips
American Christmas horror films
1972 horror films
Films set in 1950
Films set in 1970
Films set in Massachusetts
Films shot in New York (state)
Films set in abandoned houses
Incest in film
1970s Christmas horror films
Golan-Globus films
1970s English-language films
1970s American films